Joseph Jean-Guy Patrice Brisebois (born January 27, 1971) is a Canadian former professional ice hockey defenceman for the Montreal Canadiens and Colorado Avalanche, playing nearly 900 games with the former and 1,009 games overall. Brisebois was recently the Canadiens' Director of Player Development.

NHL playing career
Brisebois was drafted by the Montreal Canadiens in the second round, 30th overall, of the 1989 NHL Entry Draft. He played junior hockey for the Laval Titan and Drummondville Voltigeurs of the Quebec Major Junior Hockey League (QMJHL), and for the Fredericton Canadiens of the American Hockey League (AHL) during his first year of professional ice hockey. Brisebois's junior career was an unqualified success. In 1990–91, he captured the Emile Bouchard Trophy awarded to the best defencemen in the QMJHL, was named to the QMJHL All-Star team, and took home the award for the Canadian Hockey League (CHL)'s Best Defencemen.

He has played for the Canadiens for 14 seasons, winning one Stanley Cup with the franchise during the 1992–93 season. By 1999, Brisebois had become a staple of the Habs defence, specifically as their power play anchor. Brisebois was rewarded for his strong play with a hefty $12 million/3 years contract.

Brisebois later fell out with the Montreal fans. With his hefty contract came many expectations and the general consensus was that Brisebois was not earning his salary. His defensive vulnerability as a risk-taking offensive defenceman became a topic of contention.

As a free agent following the NHL lockout in 2004–05, Brisebois left the Canadiens to sign with the Colorado Avalanche in a two-year deal on August 3, 2005. Away from the previous pressures, Brisebois then enjoyed a career year statistically scoring a career-high 38 points with the Avalanche in the 2005–06 season.

On August 3, 2007, Brisebois, again a free agent, returned to the Montreal Canadiens, accepting a one-year incentive-laden deal for the 2007–08 season. At the end of the 2008 season the Habs extended Brisebois to further one-year deal.

Brisebois played his 1000th Career NHL game for the Montreal Canadiens on March 14, 2009 at the Bell Centre against the New Jersey Devils. This feat was eclipsed that night because Martin Brodeur reached Patrick Roy's 551 victories. However, he was awarded a prize from the vice-president of the NHL as well as a silver stick given to him by Henri Richard.

On September 24, 2009, Brisebois announced his retirement after an 18-year career in the National Hockey League. On the same day, he also received the Jean-Béliveau Trophy awarded annually to a Canadiens player for his contribution in the community.  Brisebois ranks third all-time in games played for the Canadiens as a defenceman, lacing up 896 times.

Racing career

Brisebois was not signed for the 2009–2010 NHL season. He decided to buy a NASCAR Canada car and race in two NASCAR Canada races in August 2009.

Brisebois entered the NASCAR Canadian Tire Series' 2009 GP3R 100 at Circuit Trois-Rivières, and pulled out before the end due to heat exhaustion.

Brisebois qualified in 15th for the NAPA Autopro 100 at Circuit Gilles Villeneuve, a support race for the NASCAR Nationwide Series' NAPA Auto Parts 200. He finished in 12th place.

Front office career
On June 13, 2012 the Montreal Canadiens announced that Brisebois had joined the organization as Director of Player Development. On July 17, 2014, Brisebois stepped down from his position as Director of Player Development, citing family reasons.

Career statistics

Regular season and playoffs

International

Motorsports career results

NASCAR
(key) (Bold – Pole position awarded by qualifying time. Italics – Pole position earned by points standings or practice time. * – Most laps led.)

Canadian Tire Series

Ferrari Challenge – North America

Trofeo Pirelli AM

See also
List of NHL players with 1000 games played

References

External links

1971 births
Living people
Battle of the Blades participants
Canadian ice hockey defencemen
Colorado Avalanche players
Drummondville Voltigeurs players
French Quebecers
EHC Kloten players
Ice hockey people from Montreal
Laval Titan players
Montreal Canadiens coaches
Montreal Canadiens draft picks
Montreal Canadiens players
Racing drivers from Quebec
NASCAR drivers
Stanley Cup champions
Fredericton Canadiens players
Canadian ice hockey coaches
Ferrari Challenge drivers